Patrick da Silva (born 23 October 1994) is a Danish professional footballer who plays as a left back for Faroese club KÍ. He has also represented Denmark at youth level.

Career

Brøndby
Da Silva made his Brøndby IF debut (in jersey number 35) at the age of eighteen. He was in the starting line-up in a 0–2 home defeat against Randers FC on 3 March 2013. He retained his spot, despite the fact that he formally belonged to Brøndby IF's U19 squad, for the remaining 13 games of the season in which Brøndby got clear of relegation and ended up as 9th in the Danish Superliga.

Da Silva got his first call-up for the Danish national U19 team on 19 March 2013 by national U19-coach Thomas Frank. Patrick got his international debut in the away 1–1 draw against France U19 on Stade de Auch and he scored his first U19-international goal 4 June 2013 in the 5–0 win against the Czech Republic in the UEFA Elite Round.

Da Silva got promoted to the first team 1 July 2013 and handed jersey number 23.

On 25 June Patrick signed a new tree-year contract extension until 30 June 2018 despite a season with limited appearances due to being head coach Thomas Frank’s second choice as left wingback after the Danish  International U21 starlet Riza Durmisi.

Da Silva started the 2015–16 season with a slot among the starting-11 in a staggering 9–0 home victory against the San Marino side A.C. Juvenes/Dogana in the Europa League qualification which he crowned with scoring his first European goal.

On 31 October 2016, da Silva and BIF agreed to terminate the contract.

Nordsjælland
Da Silva joined FC Nordsjælland on 26 January 2017 on a 2.5-year contract.

After a defeat against Lyngby Boldklub on 12 May 2017, Da Silva was spotted going out clubbing the same night. This violated the rules of FCN and several medias wrote, that he would be suspended. Meanwhile, nothing was confirmed. The next day, manager Kasper Hjulmand confirmed the episode and said, that Silva would be suspended for an unknown period. Da Silva was not in the squad for the next game against FC Midtjylland.

Roskilde
In September 2018 da Silva signed a contract with Danish 1st Division club FC Roskilde.

Lyngby
On 23 June 2019, Lyngby BK announced that they had signed da Silva on a three-year contract. It was a relief for da Silva to focus on football and have things calm down as this allowed for him to get closer to his top level. On 5 October 2020 the club confirmed, that da Silva's deal had been terminated by mutual consent.

Tårnby FF
After leaving Lyngby, da Silva flew to Brazil to try himself out at different clubs. However, he ended up returning to Denmark and in May 2021, he confirmed that he had joined Denmark Series club Tårnby FF. He made his debut on 9 May in a 3–3 draw against Karlslunde IF. On 28 May, he scored his first goal for the club in a 3–0 home win over RB 1906. He finished his stint with Tårnby with 26 appearances, in which he scored six goals.

KÍ
On 2 December 2021 Faroese club KÍ Klaksvík confirmed, that da Silva had signed with the club.

Personal life
Patrick took the surname of his mother, a Brazilian who hails from Recife. His father is Danish.

Sexual crimes and conviction
In March 2020, da Silva began communicating over social media with a 14-year-old female, sending sexually explicit photographs and videos on Snapchat. He had contacted her a few days earlier on Instagram. After the episode, the victim's family chose to report da Silva to the police and at the same time contacted his employer, Lyngby Boldklub. In March 2021, da Silva was sentenced to 20 days probation and must, in addition to the costs of the case, pay DKK 8,000 in compensation to the victim. As the injunction was lifted in November 2021, it was revealed that da Silva was the perpatrator.

Career statistics

(-) Not qualified

References

External links
 Patrick da Silva Danish national team statistics 

1994 births
Living people
People from Kalundborg
Danish people of Brazilian descent
Association football fullbacks
Danish men's footballers
Danish expatriate men's footballers
Denmark youth international footballers
Denmark under-21 international footballers
Danish Superliga players
Danish 1st Division players
Brøndby IF players
Randers FC players
FC Nordsjælland players
FC Roskilde players
Lyngby Boldklub players
Tårnby FF players
KÍ Klaksvík players
Expatriate footballers in the Faroe Islands
Danish male criminals
21st-century Danish criminals
Sportspeople convicted of crimes
People convicted of child sexual abuse
Sportspeople from Region Zealand